Betsy Haines (born November 5, 1960) is an American cross-country skier. She competed in the women's 5 kilometres at the 1980 Winter Olympics. Haines is a University of Vermont graduate (class of 1984), and competed on the school's Nordic ski team.

References

External links
 

1960 births
Living people
American female cross-country skiers
Olympic cross-country skiers of the United States
Cross-country skiers at the 1980 Winter Olympics
Skiers from Salt Lake City
University of Vermont alumni
Vermont Catamounts skiers
21st-century American women